Frank Squires (8 March 1921 – 1 March 1988) was a Welsh professional footballer who played as an inside forward.

Club career
Squires turned professional in June 1938 for Swansea Town and played in wartime football. He made his Football League debut for the club in 1946, scoring five goals in 36 league games for Swansea before being sold to Plymouth Argyle in October 1947. He then moved to Grimsby Town in July 1950, before a move to Merthyr Tydfil in September 1951.

Squires left Merthyr Tydfil in 1955 and signed for Southern League side Barry Town as a Player Coach. Squires made 47 appearances in the Southern League for Barry Town and 1 Welsh League appearance for their reserve side scoring a total of 7 goals for the club in a season long stint at Barry.

International career
Squires was a Welsh Schoolboy international, and played one wartime international for Wales, and also a Victory international in 1946.

Management career
He was also player-coach at Barry Town and player-manager for Brecon Corinthians.

References

1921 births
1988 deaths
Footballers from Swansea
Welsh footballers
Association football inside forwards
Swansea City A.F.C. players
Plymouth Argyle F.C. players
Grimsby Town F.C. players
Merthyr Tydfil F.C. players
English Football League players
Barry Town United F.C. players
Brecon Corinthians F.C. players
Brecon Corinthians F.C. managers
Wales schools international footballers
Wales wartime international footballers
Welsh football managers